Potassium hypochromate is a chemical compound with the formula K3CrO4 with the unusual Cr5+ ion. This compound is unstable in water but stable in alkaline solution and was found to have a similar crystal structure to potassium hypomanganate.

Preparation
This compound is commonly prepared by reacting chromium(III) oxide and potassium hydroxide at 850 °C under argon:
Cr2O3 + 6 KOH → 2 K3CrO4 + H2O + 2 H2
This compound can be prepared other ways such as replacing chromium oxide with potassium chromate. It is important that there is no Fe2+ ions present because it would reduce the Cr(V) ions to Cr(III) ions.

Reactions
Potassium hypochromate decomposes in water to form chromium(III) oxide and potassium chromate when alkali is not present or low. Potassium hypochromate also reacts with acids such as hydrochloric acid to form chromium(III) oxide, potassium chromate, and potassium chloride:
6 K3CrO4 + 10 HCl → 4 K2CrO4 + Cr2O3 + 5 H2O + 10 KCl
Other reducing agents such as hydroperoxides can reduce the hypochromate ion into chromate ions. At extremely high temperatures, it decomposes into potassium chromate and potassium metal.

This compound is used to synthesize various compounds such as chromyl chlorosulfate by reacting this compound with chlorosulfuric acid.

References

Potassium compounds
Chromates